Broughton is a locality in the City of Shoalhaven in New South Wales, Australia. It lies on the Princes Highway between Gerringong and Berry and between Broughton and Broughton Mill creeks. Broughton is to not to be confused with Broughton Village, a locality that lies to its immediate northeast, or Broughton Vale, which lies to its immediate north.

References

City of Shoalhaven
Localities in New South Wales